Marie Diane Bottrell (born 1961) is a Canadian country music singer and songwriter.  Bottrell released many singles which appeared on Canadian country music charts, and has received multiple Country Female Vocalist of the Year nominations.

Early life and education
Bottrell was born in London, Ontario. She began singing in her family's band at age eleven. At age 17 she left school to start a career as a singer.

Career
Bottrell sang and wrote songs for the Whitestone Country Band as a teenager.  In 1978 she recorded an album, Just Reach Out and Touch Me, on the MBS label. A single from this album, "This Feeling Called Love", was her first hit. That year she performed on at the Grand Ole Opry.

Bottrell was nominated for Country Female Vocalist of the Year at the Juno Awards in 1979, and again each year until 1986.

A second album was recorded in 1980, and that year her best-known single "The Star", was released. In all, eighteen of Bottrell's singles made the RPM Country Tracks charts, including five which reached the Top Ten.

Bottrell won the Canadian Country Music Association award for Female Vocalist of the Year in 1983 and 1984. Later in the 1980s her recording career stalled because of management and label problems, but she began recording again in the 1990s.

Bottrell was inducted into the Canadian Country Music Hall of Fame in 2010. That year she played the lead role in the tribute show "Patsy Cline: The Legend". In 2017 she performed at the CMA Ontario Awards gala.

In 2016 Bottrell performed at the Bluegrass in the Country Festival on Manitoulan Island.

Discography

Albums

Singles

References

External links
 
 

1961 births
Living people
Canadian women country singers
Musicians from London, Ontario
Canadian people of Cornish descent
Canadian Country Music Association Female Artist of the Year winners